PALO! is a Cuban Salsa and jazz group from Miami, Florida.

Background

In 2003, PALO!’s leader and founder Steve Roitstein invited his fellow musicians to join him in an improvised musical experiment combining Cuban music with Latin Jazz and Funk beats. After years of successfully producing artists such as Celia Cruz, Tito Puente, Ricardo Montaner, Cheo Feliciano, Oscar d’ Leon and Willy Chirino, Roitstein decided to form his own band. “My dream behind PALO! is to share the joy of music and culture with the world.” says PALO!’s leader, producer, pianist and beatmaker.

PALO! received a nomination for a Grammy and a Latin Grammy for their album PALO! Live. The band was named Miami New Times Best Band 2012 (Readers’ Choice) and Best Latin Band 2014.  PALO! is a featured act in clubs and live music venues, festivals, corporate events, and private events throughout the world.

Afro-Cuban Funk
PALO! plays their own style of Cuban music they call “Afro-Cuban Funk”. Just think “funky, jazzy salsa”, or better yet, listen to some of their music.

Virtuoso Musicians
PALO!’s catchy original songs have always featured extraordinary musicians. The current lineup includes the incredible vocals of charismatic Cuban singers Miriam Martinez, Dannah Santiago and Julio Cesar. The scorching percussion of Dayron Gallardo and Otto Santana punctuate the performances with Cuban fire. Latin Jazz saxophonist Aldo Salvent brings an electrifying unpredictability to every song. Bandleader Steve Roitstein fuses these elements with a foundation of edgy, unforgettable rhythms.

Some of the PALO! story was told in two award-winning PBS documentary films:

Miami Boheme (Emmy, Telly and Aurora Award winner)
Ivy League Rumba (Aurora Award winner, Emmy-nominated)

Culture & Education
In addition to creating and performing music, PALO! loves to do workshops, master classes, clinics, panels, and cultural seminars.

Members 
 Recording Members
Steve Roitstein: keyboard, beats, coros
Miriam Mar: lead vocals, percussion
Julio Cesar Rodriguez Delet: lead vocals, percussion
Dannah Santiago: flute, vocals, percussion
Aldo Salvent: sax
Dayron Gallardo: congas
Otto Santana: timbales

Discography
 2009: This Is Afro-Cuban Funk
 2014: PALO! Live
 2016: Yo Quiero Guarachar

Awards
Grammy Awards

|-
|2015||PALO! Live || Best Tropical Latin Album || 
|-

Latin Grammy Awards

|-
|rowspan="1"| 2014 || PALO! Live || Best Contemporary Tropical Album || 
|-
|rowspan="1"| 2013 || Leslie Cartaya || Best New Artist || 

Emmy Awards

|-
|2014|||Miami Boheme || Documentary – Cultural (Suncoast Chapter) || 
|-

See also

Music of Miami
Afro-Cuban Funk

References

External links
 PALO! Official Website

Musical groups from Miami
2003 establishments in Florida
Musical groups established in 2003
American Latin musical groups
Latin jazz ensembles
American jazz ensembles from Florida